The Chrysalids is an adaptation of the John Wyndham 1955 novel of the same name, produced as a radio play by the BBC in March 1981. It was first broadcast on BBC Radio 4 on the 25 April 1981 with an audience of 150,000 listeners. The play was edited into three half hour episodes and broadcast in Canada by CBC Radio from 10 June to 24 June 1983. (There was a new adaptation of the book by Jane Rogers in 2012, broadcast in two one-hour episodes on BBC Radio 4.)

CD release

The Radio Play was released on CD as an Audiobook in 2007. It was entitled The Chrysalids & Survival and contained the original 1981 version of the Chrysalids and the 1989 BBC radio 4 adaptation of John Wyndham's Survival.

Back cover synopsis
"Ten-year-old David is a happy, ordinary boy, untroubled except for occasional strange dreams about a mysterious city - until he befriends Sophie, who is unlike anybody he has met before: she has six toes. But in the ultra-religious village of Waknut, all abnormality is abhorred as an offense against God, and he must keep her secret to himself. When he learns that he, too, is 'deviant', he realises that differences can be very dangerous indeed..."

Cast and credits
David.......................Stephen Garlick
Rosalind....................Amanda Murray
Petra.......................Judy Bennett
Michael.....................Spencer Banks
Katherine...................Phillipa Ritchie
Rachel......................Jennifer Lee
Anne........................Kathryn Hurlbutt
David as a child............Susan Sheridan
Sofie as a child............Elissa Derwent
Mrs Wender/Sealander........Jennifer Piercey
Mr Wender/Spiderman.........Robin Browne
Mary........................Elizabeth Rider
Father......................Peter Baldwin
Mother......................Sonia Fraser
Uncle Axel..................Michael Spice
Inspector...................John Rye
Jacob.......................William Eedle
Skinner.....................Martyn Read
Sopie.......................Jane Knoles

Dramatized by Barbara Clegg

Produced by Michael Bartlett

References

External links
 
 BBC H2G2 Synopsis/Analysis of ''The Chrysalids
 Quotes From The Chrysalids
 Lyrics of "Crown of Creation"

1981 radio dramas
British radio dramas

cs:Kukly
de:Wem gehört die Erde?
es:Las Crisálidas
fr:Les Transformés
it:I trasfigurati
ro:Crisalidele